The 2009 Prince Edward Island Scotties Tournament of Hearts, Prince Edward Island's women's provincial curling championship, was held January 22–26 at the Silver Fox Curling and Yacht Club in Summerside. The winner represented team Prince Edward Island at the 2009 Scotties Tournament of Hearts in Victoria, British Columbia.

Teams

Standings

Results

January 22
Dolan 12-3 Currie
Birt 7-4 Butler

January 23
Dolan 9-3 MacPhee
Butler 10-3 Currie  
MacPhee 13-6 Currie 
Birt 9-8 Dolan

January 24
Birt 12-2 Currie  
MacPhee 8-4 Butler 
MacPhee 7-6 Birt  
Dolan 8-2 Butler

Page playoffs
1 vs. 2, 3 vs. 4, on January 25. Semi-Final and Final on January 26.

1 vs. 2

3 vs. 4

Semi-final

Final

Official site

Prince Edward Island
Sport in Summerside, Prince Edward Island
Curling competitions in Prince Edward Island
2009 in Prince Edward Island